Stan Mobile is a former mobile virtual network operator service based in the United Kingdom. The company was based on the 3 network and offered mainly pay as you go SIMs, although they also offered a rolling contract of £9.99 a month for one gigabyte of data.

References

Mobile phone companies of the United Kingdom
Mobile virtual network operators